Mimbs is a surname. Notable people with the surname include:

Mike Mimbs (born 1969), American baseball pitcher
Robert Mimbs (born 1964), Canadian Football League running back